This is a list of players who have scored five or more goals in a National Hockey League (NHL) game. Scoring five or more goals in a single game is considered a great feat, as it has only been accomplished 63 times, by 47 players, in the history of the league. The first player to do so was Joe Malone, with the Montreal Canadiens, in the first NHL game, on December 19, 1917. The most recent player to do so was Tage Thompson, with the Buffalo Sabres, in the 105th NHL season of play, on December 7, 2022.

In addition to being first, Joe Malone holds the overall record with five five-or-more goal games, including the NHL record seven goals in a game, as well as a six-goal game and three five-goal games – all in the first three seasons of the NHL’s existence. He is also the only player to record a five-goal game with more than one team, accomplishing his first three with the Montreal Canadiens and his last two with the Quebec Bulldogs.

Overall, seven players have scored six goals in a game—including brothers Corb and Cy Denneny, with different teams, within a few weeks of each other in 1921. A total of 41 individual players have scored exactly five goals in a game, on one or more occasion. While five-goal games continue to occur from time to time, no player has scored six or more goals since Darryl Sittler scored six in February 1976.

Only eight players have multiple five-goal games. After Malone achieving the mark five times, both Wayne Gretzky and Mario Lemieux attained the mark four times, Newsy Lalonde did it three times, while four other players have had two five-goal games. Of the eight players with multiple five-goal games, only two have achieved the feat multiple times in a single season: Malone (3 times in 1917–18, twice in 1919–20) and Sittler (twice in 1975–76). Gretzky (early and late 1981) and Maurice Richard (early and late 1944) had two five-goal games in the same calendar year, across two NHL seasons.

Ian Turnbull is the only defenseman who has scored five goals in a game, doing so in February 1977. Mario Lemieux is the only player in history to achieve a five-goal game by scoring in five different ways – on December 31, 1988, he scored an even-strength goal, a power-play goal, a short-handed goal, a penalty shot goal and an empty net goal against the New Jersey Devils. Wayne Gretzky’s second five-goal game, in December 1981, also marked his achievement of the NHL’s fastest  50 goals in 50 games, when he scored five goals in his 39th game of the season.

Of the 63 five-goal games, five instances were occurred in a playoff game.

The Montreal Canadiens have had the highest number of players, 9, and the highest number of occurrences, 14, of a five-goal game. The Toronto St. Patricks/Toronto Maple Leafs are second in both categories, with 7 players scoring a five-goal game, on 9 occasions.
Five players: Newsy Lalonde in 1919, Maurice Richard in 1944, Darryl Sittler and Reggie Leach in 1976, and Mario Lemieux in 1989 scored 5 goals in playoff games.

Alexey Zhamnov is the only player from this list whose team eventually failed to win — the Los Angeles Kings and the Winnipeg Jets tied 7–7. Sergei Fedorov is the only player to score all 5 of his team's goals in a game that ended in overtime (regular season). Maurice Richard scored all 5 goals when the Canadiens defeated Toronto 5-1 in the 1944 playoffs.

Scorers

 

Legend

Players who scored five or more goals in multiple games

References

General

Specific

5 goals in a game
National Hockey League statistical records